The Jhadeswar Institute of Engineering & Technology(JIET), Balasore is a private run diploma engineering school established in 2009 by Jhadeswar Educational Trust. Jhadeswar Educational Trust has also have established an ITC in 2007. It is now affiliated to SCTE & VT, Odisha and also approved by AICTE.

Campus 

Facilities 
The institution gives a basic need facility to its students. It provides bus and hostel facilities to all its students and also has a well maintained canteen inside the campus with hygienic food cooking faculty. The institution has a library with insufficient books for students syllabus and curriculum.

Courses offered 
It offers three year diploma engineering course under the curriculum of SCTE & VT. 
 Mechanical engineering
 Electrical engineering
 Civil engineering
 Electronics and telecommunication engineering

Admission procedure
Students can get admission through Diploma Entrance Test conducted by SCTE & VT after matriculation. Also students can get admission in lateral after ITI or +2 Sc. directly to the third semester.

Controversy
JIET also found involved in cyber crime. In 2010, the institution was found guilty in hacking of DET Orissa website and auto choice of students to select JIET. In an e-counselling process, almost 32 students suffered from that and complained. When the authorities investigate, the principal of JIET was responsible.

References

External links
Official website

Private engineering colleges in India
Engineering colleges in Odisha
Education in Balasore district
Educational institutions established in 2009
2009 establishments in Orissa